Wojnity  is a village in the administrative district of Gmina Pieniężno, within Braniewo County, Warmian-Masurian Voivodeship, in northern Poland.

The village has a population of 96.

References

External links
Wojnity on Terraserver

Wojnity